The University of Technology - Yatanarpon Cyber City (abbreviated as UTYCC) is located at Yatanarpon Cyber City,  Myanmar.

Programs

Bachelor's degree
B.E. (IST) Bachelor of Engineering (Information Science and Technology)
B.E. (CE) Bachelor of Engineering (Computer Engineering)
B.E. (EcE) Bachelor of Engineering (Electronics Engineering)
B.E. (MPA) Bachelor of Engineering (Mechanical Precision and Automation)
B.E.(AME) Bachelor of Engineering (Materials and Metallurgy)

Master Program
M.E. (Information Science and Technology)
M.E. (Computer Engineering)
M.E. (Electronics Engineering)
M.E. (Materials and Metallurgy)
M.E. (Mechanical Precision & Automation)

Doctorate Program
Ph.D (Information Technology)

Faculties and departments

Faculties
 Faculty of Information and Communication Technology
 Department of Information Science and Technology
 Department of Computer Engineering
 Faculty of Electronics Engineering
 Faculty of Advanced Materials Engineering
 Faculty of Precision Engineering

Academic departments
 Department of Myanmar
 Department of English
 Department of Engineering Mathematics
 Department of Engineering Physics
 Department of Engineering Chemistry

Supporting departments
 Maintenance
 Administration
 Finance
 Student Affairs

References

About Page

Technological universities in Myanmar
Universities and colleges in Mandalay Region